Events of 2019 in Moldova.

Incumbents
 President – Igor Dodon
 Prime Minister – Pavel Filip (until June 8), Maia Sandu (June 8 - November 14), Ion Chicu (starting November 14)
 President of the Parliament – Andrian Candu (until February 24), Zinaida Greceanîi (starting June 8)

Events 
 2 February – The 660th anniversary of the founding of the Moldovan state will be celebrated.
 24 February – The 2019 Moldovan parliamentary election and the 2019 Moldovan referendum.
 7–15 June – 2019 Moldovan constitutional crisis
 23 August – The 75th anniversary of the Second Jassy–Kishinev Offensive is celebrated.
20 October – 2019 Moldovan local elections

Births

Deaths 

 February 20 - Boris Vieru, 61, Moldovan politician and journalist, MP (2009–2014).

References

 
Moldova
Years of the 21st century in Moldova
Moldova